The Tudor Vladimirescu Division (full name: Romanian 1st Volunteer Infantry Division 'Tudor Vladimirescu – Debrecen' ) was a Soviet-organized division of Romanians that fought against Germany and Hungary during the final year of World War II.

Creation
Named after Tudor Vladimirescu, the leader of the Wallachian uprising of 1821, the division was formed from Romanian prisoners of war in October 1943, under the command of Brigadier General Nicolae Cambrea.

Wartime service
The division marched into Bucharest on August 29, 1944 as liberators, liberating the city alongside the units of the Romanian Army when Romania left the Axis Powers and attacked German troops stationed in the country.

The division, still under Soviet control, saw real combat during the final months of the war in Transylvania, Hungary, and Czechoslovakia, playing a key role in the Soviet seizure of Debrecen, Hungary, in October 1944. Combat losses were heavy; by March 1945 the strength of the division had sunk to 4,436 men.

In March 1945 the division was pulled out of the front lines, but remained under the operational control of the 2nd Ukrainian Front until August 15, 1945.

Postwar political role
In late 1945 the division was reported to have been integrated into the Romanian 4th Army. Relentlessly politicized by their communist leaders, the Tudor Vladimirescu Division became a politically reliable military formation of the Romanian communists. Along with another Romanian communist unit, the Horea, Cloșca și Crișan Division, and backed by tens of thousands of Red Army troops, the Tudor Vladimirescu Division played a key role in imposing communist rule in Romania after the war. The two communist divisions were integrated into the Romanian Army on August 22, 1945. The Tudor Vladimirescu Division was converted into an armored division by 1947 while the regular Romanian army was reduced to four divisions with no tanks, thus providing the Romanian communists the trump cards of mobility and firepower had a conflict with anti-communist elements in the Romanian Army taken place.

The Division was converted into the 1st Armored Division in 1947, then 5 Tank Corps, followed by 47 Tank Corps, and finally take the name of 37 Mechanised Division, which became in 1957 a Mechanised Division.

In the 1950s, during the Soviet occupation of Romania, Soviet officers were employed as advisors. Order subunits (battalions, companies) was matched by political officers. After 1956-1957, the youth division officers were assigned to three years in military school or other schools in Sibiu.

See also
Romania in World War II
Horea, Cloșca și Crișan Division
Soviet occupation of Romania

References

External links
The Romanian Army of World War 2, Mark Axworthy and Horia Șerbănescu, London: Osprey, 1991. .
Stalins Fremde Heere, Peter Gosztony, Bonn: Bernard & Graefe Verlag, 1991. .

Military history of Romania during World War II
Military history of the Soviet Union during World War II
Expatriate units and formations of Romania
Socialist Republic of Romania
Divisions of Romania
Romania–Soviet Union relations
Military units and formations established in 1943